Monika Ann-Mari (Anne-Marie) Eklund Löwinder (Amel), born 26 September 1957 in Stockholm, is a Swedish Internet expert.

Biography
She is the Chief Information Security Officer at IIS, The Internet Foundation in Sweden. She also serves on the boards of internet-related organisations including the Council of European National Top Level Domain Registries (CENTR) and the Swedish Law and Informatics Research Institute.

Eklund Löwinder has been appointed Trusted Community Representative by the Internet Corporation for Assigned Names and Numbers (ICANN). She is one of seven people who control the DNSSEC key generation for the internet root zone.

In 2013, Eklund Löwinder was the first Swede to be included in the Internet Hall of Fame. Interviewed in 2014, she said "I have to admit I love the internet. It's a piece of engineering art you have to admire. And to be able to contribute to make this a safer place makes me feel good." Along with Leif Johansson and Peter Löthberg, she was also part of the TU-stiftelsen foundation, which runs the Netnod. 

Eklund Löwinder holds a candidate in computer science from Stockholm University.

References

External links
 Blog posts by Anne-Marie Eklund-Löwinder 

1957 births
Living people
Stockholm University alumni
Swedish computer scientists
Swedish women computer scientists
Scientists from Stockholm